The ARIA Singles Chart ranks the best-performing singles in Australia. Its data, published by the Australian Recording Industry Association, is based collectively on the weekly physical and digital sales and streams of singles. Fourteen songs topped the chart in 2022, with Mariah Carey's "All I Want for Christmas Is You" topping the chart in a fourth separate year, "Cold Heart (Pnau remix)" by Elton John and Dua Lipa returning to number one after spending five weeks at number one in 2021, and "Stay" by the Kid Laroi and Justin Bieber returning to number one as well, after its 14-week stay at number one in 2021. The best-performing song of 2021 in Australia, "Heat Waves" by English band Glass Animals, also returned to number one after six weeks atop the chart in early 2021. As It Was by Harry Styles was the best-performing song of 2022, spending a total of 8 non-consecutive weeks at number one.

Kate Bush's 1985 song "Running Up That Hill (A Deal with God)" returned to the chart dated 6 June, and topped the chart the following week, after being featured in season 4 of Netflix series Stranger Things. It marks Bush's second number-one single in Australia after "Wuthering Heights" in 1978.

Blackpink became the first K-pop group to top the singles chart with "Pink Venom" debuting atop the chart dated 29 August.

Six artists, Jack Harlow, Joji, Blackpink, Nicki Minaj, Bebe Rexha and Kim Petras, reached the top for the first time. Elton John reached the top twice in the same year, with "Cold Heart (Pnau remix)" and "Hold Me Closer".

Chart history

Number-one artists

See also
 2022 in music
 List of number-one albums of 2022 (Australia)

References

Australia singles
Number-one singles
2022